Dhamangaon Badhe is a town in Motala taluka of Buldana district,the sarpanch of Dhamangaon Badhe is with a population of over 10000. It is located on the boundaries of the Buldana, Jalgaon, and Aurangabad districts. Beauty of the city have masjid and mandir beside of each other.

References

Cities and towns in Buldhana district